Kinntanna Peak is a sharp peak,  high, about  north of Holtanna Peak in the eastern part of Fenriskjeften Mountain in Queen Maud Land, Antarctica. It was mapped from surveys and air photos by the Sixth Norwegian Antarctic Expedition (1956–60) and named Kinntanna (the molar).

References

Mountains of Queen Maud Land
Princess Astrid Coast